Stay Tooned! is a British television programme which aired on BBC from March 1990 to 1997. The programme is presented by Tony Robinson, in which he discusses in detail and explains in depth cartoon characters, and the people and studios behind the cartoons, as well as looks over the history of cartoons.

Unlike Rolf Harris Cartoon Time, in which he performed as filler between the cartoons, Tony Robinson tried to provide greater detail about the particular topic on which he would focus each week. This meant that the range of depth of the series went beyond run of the mill classics, and on occasion featured more obscure cartoons including Betty Boop, Animal Farm, and those made by independent producers.

Censored toons
For one of the episodes, they looked at censored cartoons from over the years and included broadcast of Tin Pan Alley Cats and Angel Puss.

Episodes
Over the course of each year, episodes would broadcast when appropriate slots were available on Saturday or Sunday Tea time slot.

 1990: 22 episodes 
 1991: 20 episodes
 1992: 13 episodes
 1993: 12 episodes
 1994: 6 episodes
 1995: 8 episodes
 1996: 13 April – 11 May 1996 5 Episodes

20 Episodes were repeated on Sunday Mornings on BBC Two during 1997.

References

External links
 BFI.org Not a complete list of episodes.

1990s British children's television series
1990 British television series debuts
1997 British television series endings
BBC Television shows
English-language television shows